Lovrenco Franičević (born January 8, 1978 in Split) is a former butterfly swimmer from Croatia, who competed for his native country at the Sydney Olympics in 2000. There he was eliminated in the heats of the Men's 200 m Butterfly, with a time of 02:04.35.

External links
 Lovrenco Franičević 

1978 births
Living people
Male butterfly swimmers
Olympic swimmers of Croatia
Swimmers at the 1996 Summer Olympics
Swimmers at the 2000 Summer Olympics
Sportspeople from Split, Croatia
Croatian male swimmers
Mediterranean Games bronze medalists for Croatia
Mediterranean Games medalists in swimming
Swimmers at the 2001 Mediterranean Games
20th-century Croatian people
21st-century Croatian people